Richard Young (August 6, 1846 – June 9, 1935) was a U.S. Representative from New York.

Born in Derry, Ireland, Young migrated to the United States in 1851 with his parents, who settled in Philadelphia, Pennsylvania. He attended the public schools and graduated from Crittenden's Commercial College in Philadelphia. He moved to Flatbush, New York (which was incorporated into Brooklyn City in 1894), in 1866 and engaged in an extensive leather trade in New York City. He served as a member of the board of school commissioners of Brooklyn from 1895 to 1902, and as park commissioner for the boroughs of Brooklyn and Queens in 1902 and 1903. He also engaged in banking and business enterprises.

Young was elected as a Republican to the Sixty-first Congress (March 4, 1909 – March 3, 1911). He declined to be a candidate for re-election in 1910.

Subsequently, he resumed his interest in the leather industry and continued in banking and in other business enterprises in Brooklyn. He resided in Flatbush in Brooklyn, New York, until his death on June 9, 1935. He was interred in Green-Wood Cemetery.

References 

19th-century Irish people
1846 births
1935 deaths
Burials at Green-Wood Cemetery
Irish emigrants to the United States (before 1923)
Republican Party members of the United States House of Representatives from New York (state)
School board members in New York (state)
Politicians from Derry (city)